The following is a timeline of the history of the city of Karlskoga, Sweden (originally Möckelns bodar).

Prior to 16th century 

 1261 – First mention of Karlskoga as Möckelsbodar.

16th century 

 1586 – Karlskoga Parish is established.
 1589 – Parish renamed after Charles IX of Sweden.

19th century 

 1825 – The first folkskola is established.
 1870s – Nora–Karlskoga Line opens
 1883 – The Swedish newspaper Karlskoga Tidning is established as a weekly periodical.
 1885 – Street lighting begins.
 1894 – Alfred Nobel acquired Karlskoga-based corporation Bofors-Gullspång.
 1897 – Karlskoga Municipal Community is established.

20th century 

 1900 – Population surpassed 10,000 inhabitants.
 1904 – The Karlskoga epidemical hospital is established.
 1925 – Degerfors detached itself from the Karlskoga Municipal Community.
 1940 – Karlskoga Parish is established as a new administrative entity, "Karlskoga stad".
 1944 – BIK Karlskoga is established.
 1946 – Opening of Karlskoga Art Gallery.
 1963 – KB Karlskoga FF is established.
 1972 – Karlskoga folk high school is established.
 1974 – K-center Galleria is established.
 1979 – Hosted the 1979 World Junior Ice Hockey Championships.
 1985 – On 10 January 1985, a gas leak occurs at Björkborn.
 1994 – Sweden becomes part of the European Union.
 1996 – City twinned with Narva in Estonia.

21st century 

 2009 – Karlskoga tingsrätt disestablished.
 2015 – Karlskoga Municipality celebrated surpassing of 30,000 inhabitants.
 2022 – The new Björkborn Bridge replaces the old, poorly maintained bridge.

See also 

 Timeline of Swedish history

Notes

References 

Karlskoga
Karlskoga Municipality